The 2000–01 Toronto Maple Leafs season was the franchise's 84th season of existence and their 74th season as the Maple Leafs. The team finished third in the Northeast Division with a 37–29–11–5 record (90 points). In the 2001 Stanley Cup playoffs, they swept their rivals, the first-place Ottawa Senators, four games to none in the Eastern Conference Quarterfinals before falling to the New Jersey Devils in seven games in the Eastern Conference Semifinals.

Off-season
Key dates prior to the start of the season:
 The 2000 NHL Entry Draft
 The free agency period began on July 1.

Regular season
The Leafs scored the fewest short-handed goals in the NHL during the regular season, with just two.

Season standings

Schedule and results

 † Hockey Hall of Fame Game

Playoffs

Round 1: (2) Ottawa Senators vs. (7) Toronto Maple Leafs

Round 2: (1) New Jersey Devils vs. (7) Toronto Maple Leafs

Player statistics

Regular season
Scoring

Goaltending

Playoffs
Scoring

Goaltending

Awards and records

Records

Milestones

Transactions
The Maple Leafs have been involved in the following transactions during the 2000–01 season.

Trades

Waivers

Free agents

Draft picks
Toronto's draft picks at the 2000 NHL Entry Draft held at the Pengrowth Saddledome in Calgary, Alberta.

See also
 2000–01 NHL season

References
 Maple Leafs on Hockey Database

Toronto Maple Leafs season, 2000-01
Toronto Maple Leafs seasons
Toronto